This is a list of defunct airlines of Sri Lanka.

See also
 List of airlines of Sri Lanka
 List of airports in Sri Lanka

References

Sri Lanka
Airlines
Airlines, defunct